Yefim Aronovich Chulak (born 15 July 1948) is a Russian former volleyball player who competed for the Soviet Union in the 1972 Summer Olympics and in the 1976 Summer Olympics. He is Jewish.

In 1972 he was part of the Soviet team which won the bronze medal in the Olympic tournament. He played all seven matches.

Four years later he won the silver medal with the Soviet team in the 1976 Olympic tournament. He played all five matches.

See also
List of select Jewish volleyball players

References

External links
 
 

1948 births
Living people
People from Gagauzia
Moldovan Jews
Soviet Jews
Soviet men's volleyball players
Olympic volleyball players of the Soviet Union
Volleyball players at the 1972 Summer Olympics
Volleyball players at the 1976 Summer Olympics
Olympic silver medalists for the Soviet Union
Olympic bronze medalists for the Soviet Union
Olympic medalists in volleyball
Russian men's volleyball players
Medalists at the 1976 Summer Olympics
Medalists at the 1972 Summer Olympics